Drasteria obscurata is a moth of the family Erebidae. It is found in Iran, Afghanistan, Kazakhstan, Kyrgyzstan, Uzbekistan and Tadjikistan.

References

Drasteria
Moths described in 1888
Moths of Asia